This is the discography of British band the Style Council.

Albums

Studio albums

Live albums

Compilation albums

Box sets

Video albums

EPs

Singles

Notes

References

Discographies of British artists
Pop music group discographies
Rock music group discographies
New wave discographies